Redbird is an unincorporated community in Holt County, Nebraska, United States.

History
A post office was established at Redbird (also spelled Red Bird) in the 1870s. Redbird was named from Redbird Creek nearby.

References

Unincorporated communities in Holt County, Nebraska
Unincorporated communities in Nebraska